Wayne Morrin (born May 13, 1955) is a Canadian retired professional ice hockey player who played 13 games in the World Hockey Association with the Calgary Cowboys during the 1976–77 WHA season. He was drafted by the Toronto Toros in the 13th round (168th overall pick) of the 1975 WHA Amateur Draft.

References

External links
 

1955 births
Buffalo Norsemen players
Calgary Cowboys players
Charlotte Checkers (SHL) players
Ice hockey people from British Columbia
Living people
People from Dawson Creek
Toronto Toros draft picks
Canadian ice hockey defencemen